Strzałkowski (feminine: Strzałkowska, plural: Strzałkowscy) is a surname of Polish origin that may refer to:

Adrian Strzałkowski (born 1990), Polish long jumper
Romek Strzałkowski (1943–1956), Polish child killed during the Poznań 1956 protests

Polish-language surnames